Polblue is a mountain on the Barrington Tops plateau, located in the Mid-Coast Council within New South Wales, Australia.

The surrounding area is covered by sub alpine snow gum woodland and high altitude swamps. Nearby is a popular camping ground and bushwalking trails contained with the Barrington Tops National Park.

See also

 List of mountains of New South Wales

References 

Mid-Coast Council
Polblue